Wendy Wood may refer to:

Wendy Wood (artist) (1892–1981), Scottish artist and independence campaigner
Wendy Wood (psychologist), American social psychologist
Wendy Wood (tennis) (born 1964), American professional tennis player